Malaciotis is a monotypic moth genus of the family Crambidae described by Edward Meyrick in 1934. It contains only one species, Malaciotis thiogramma, described by the same author in the same year, which is found in Katanga Province of the Democratic Republic of the Congo.

References

Spilomelinae
Taxa named by Edward Meyrick
Monotypic moth genera
Crambidae genera
Moths of Africa